USS APL-5 is an APL-2-class barracks ship of the United States Navy.

Construction and career
The ship was laid down on 8 July 1944, by the Puget Sound Navy Yard and launched on 14 November 1944. She was commissioned on 5 November 1945.

She was put into the reserve fleet by January 1947.

APL-5 was deployed to Vietnam in November 1966 to provide accommodation to sailors stationed in Chu Lai during the Vietnam War. Upon arriving, the ship had run into muddy grounds and became stuck. USS Manhattan was sent to free her from the mud, in which the ship was successfully freed and guided her to her berthing area in Chu Lai. APL-5 had 4-inch/50 cal guns for self defense.

The ship undertook the CincPacFlt Berthing and Messing Program, in which she is berthed in San Diego since at least the early 2000s. She is being used as a berthing and messing barge.

Awards 
National Defense Service Medal
Vietnam Service Medal
Republic of Vietnam Campaign Medal

References

 

 

Barracks ships of the United States Navy
Ships built in Bremerton, Washington
1944 ships
Vietnam War auxiliary ships of the United States